The 2023 Penrith Panthers season is the 57th season in the club's history. Coached by Ivan Cleary and co-captained by Nathan Cleary and Isaah Yeo, the Panthers are competing in the National Rugby League's 2023 Telstra Premiership.

20th Anniversary 
In 2023 it will be the 20th anniversary of there win of the 2003 NRL Grand Final beating Sydney Roosters to obtain there second premiership

Jerseys & Sponsors 
The 2023 home, away and alternate jerseys look similar to the ones shown below

Sponsors

Squad 
Source:

Fixtures

Pre-season challenge

Regular season
PG: Penalty Goal 
FG: Field Goal

Ladder

Player movements

Player transfers

Gains

Losses

References

Penrith Panthers seasons
Penrith Panthers season